The Seaside Signal is a weekly newspaper published for the community of Seaside, Oregon, United States by Seaside Signal, Inc.

History
The Signal was founded Saturday, March 25, 1905 as a weekly. It was edited by  R. M. Watson. The paper was a tabloid format and cost $2.00 for a year's subscription.
On May 11, 1907 the newspaper changed to a broadsheet format. Since then, the Signal has changed formats numerous times.

The paper was acquired by EO Media Group in 2013.

References

External links
Seaside Signal
Profile of Seaside Signal at Oregon Newspaper Publishers Association
Library of Congress

1905 establishments in Oregon
Newspapers published in Oregon
Oregon Newspaper Publishers Association
Publications established in 1905
Seaside, Oregon